Henry Peters House is a historic home located at Garrett, DeKalb County, Indiana.  It was built about 1910, and is a two-story, Colonial Revival-style frame dwelling. It has a hip roofed main block with projecting end gables.  It features a hip roofed wraparound porch.

It was added to the National Register of Historic Places in 1983.

References

Houses on the National Register of Historic Places in Indiana
Colonial Revival architecture in Indiana
Houses completed in 1910
Houses in DeKalb County, Indiana
National Register of Historic Places in DeKalb County, Indiana